Daniel Anthony Cronin (born November 14, 1927) is an American prelate of the Roman Catholic Church. He served as bishop of the Diocese of Fall River in Massachusetts from 1970 to 1992, and as archbishop of the Archdiocese of Hartford in Connecticut from 1992 to 2003.

Biography

Early life 
Daniel Cronin was born on November 14, 1927, in Newton, Massachusetts eldest son of Daniel G. and Emily (Joyce) Cronin.  He and attended St. Peter School in Cambridge, Massachusetts and graduated from Boston College High School in Boston in 1945. He studied at St. John's Seminary in Boston from 1945 to 1949, and then furthered his studied at the Pontifical North American College in Rome.

Priesthood 
Cronin was ordained to the priesthood in Rome by Cardinal Clemente Micara on December 20, 1952. He then earned a Licentiate of Sacred Theology (1953) and Doctorate of Sacred Theology (1956) from the Pontifical Gregorian University.

Cronin did pastoral work in Salisbury, Lynn, and Waltham, all in Massachusetts before becoming an attaché of the Apostolic Internunciature to Ethiopia in 1957. The Vatican appointed him as an attaché of the Secretariat of State in 1961, and as a papal chamberlain in 1962.

Auxiliary Bishop of Boston 
On June 10, 1968, Cronin was appointed as an auxiliary bishop of the Archdiocese of Boston and titular bishop of Egnatia by Pope Paul VI. He received his episcopal consecration on September 12, 1968, from Cardinal Richard Cushing, with Bishops Jeremiah Minihan and Thomas Riley serving as co-consecrators, at the Cathedral of the Holy Cross in Boston.  Cronin selected as his episcopal motto: "Ad Oboediendum Fidei", meaning, "For Obedience of Faith" from Romans 1:5. As an auxiliary bishop, he also served as pastor of St. Raphael Parish in Medford, Massachusetts.

Bishop of Fall River 
Cronin was named by Paul VI as the fifth bishop of the Diocese of Fall River on October 30, 1970. He succeeded Bishop James Connolly.  Cronin was installed at St. Mary of the Assumption Cathedral in Fall River on December 16, 1970. In 1975, Cronin publicly denounced U.S. Senator Ted Kennedy (D-MA) when Kennedy declared that he would not vote to outlaw abortion, although saying that he did not personally support it.

Archbishop of Hartford 
On December 10, 1991, Cronin was appointed the third archbishop of the Archdiocese of Hartford by Pope John Paul II. He succeeded Archbishop John Whealon.  Cronin was installed at the Cathedral of St. Joseph in Hartford on January 28, 1992. He received the pallium, a vestment worn by metropolitan bishops, from John Paul II at St. Peter's Basilica on June 29, 1991. 

On October 20, 2003, John Paul II accepted Cronin's resignation as archbishop of Hartford.

Views 
Considered theologically conservative, Cronin once stated  "The dominion of human life is in the hands of God. The gift of life starts from the time of conception and ends at the time of natural death."

See also
 

 Catholic Church hierarchy
 Catholic Church in the United States
 Historical list of the Catholic bishops of the United States
 List of Catholic bishops of the United States
 Lists of patriarchs, archbishops, and bishops

References

External links
Roman Catholic Archdiocese of Hartford
Roman Catholic Diocese of Fall River

Episcopal succession

1927 births
Living people
Saint John's Seminary (Massachusetts) alumni
Pontifical Gregorian University alumni
People from Newton, Massachusetts
Roman Catholic bishops of Hartford
Roman Catholic bishops of Fall River
20th-century Roman Catholic archbishops in the United States
Boston College High School alumni
American expatriates in Italy
21st-century Roman Catholic archbishops in the United States
American Roman Catholic archbishops